Aria is a Russian heavy metal band that was formed in 1985 in Moscow. Although it was not the first Soviet band to play heavy music, Aria was the first to break through to mainstream media and commercial success. According to several public polls, Aria ranks among top 10 most popular Russian rock bands. Their sound resembled that of NWOBHM bands, for which they were dubbed the "Russian Iron Maiden" in the media.

The band has most of its lyrics written by professional poets, Margarita Pushkina and Alexander Yelin commonly, and not by its band members. Since the band was founded, several of its founder members have gone on to form bands of their own resulting in Aria becoming the root of the so-called "Aria Family". Master, a band formed by four ex-members of Aria, is one of the most influential Russian metal bands. Kipelov is another example of a band formed by lead vocalist Valery Kipelov, who remained with the band til 2002.

History

Early days
The band was founded by Vladimir Holstinin and Alik Granovsky, two members of the VIA Poyushchie Serdtsa (Singing Hearts). They both had played in the band Alpha, dissolved by that time. Holstinin's idea of creating a heavy metal band was enthusiastically accepted by Granovsky. By 1985 they had most of the material for their album ready, all that remained was to find a recording studio and a vocalist. They asked Victor Vekshtein to be the band's manager and allow them to use his studio. The vocalist position was soon filled by Valery Kipelov.

The name Aria was given to the band because it was short, catchy and easily transliterated. There is a version that the band's name was thought up by Holstinin, who owns a guitar from the eponymous manufacturer. Both fans and members of Aria are often informally referred to as "ariytsi" (Russian for Aryans).

According to the band's website, Aria's birthday is celebrated on 31 October 1985; the date they finished working on their first album, Megalomania. The album was noticed by heavy music fans because it was much unlike any hard rock music played in the USSR at the time.

Megalomania was recorded with only Holstinin playing guitar (with Alexander Lvov on drums and Kirill Pokrovsky on keyboards). The band needed a second guitarist to be able to play live. As a result, Andrey Bolshakov joined the band. In addition, Igor Molchanov (who had played in Alpha, too) replaced Lvov on drums.

Aria's bands first live show was on 5 February 1986 in DK MAI. The band was well received by the public, and soon became a laureate of the Rock-Panorama-86 and Lituanica-86 festivals. Although they were still being ignored by the media, their popularity kept rising.

In November 1986, Aria released their second album, Who Are You With?. By this time, the band was divided by arguments concerning both the direction the band was heading, and Victor Vekshtein's management skills. After a tour in January 1987, Granovsky, Bolshakov, Molchanov, Pokrovsky left Aria and formed the thrash metal band Master). They were replaced by Vitaly Dubinin (Holstinin's university friend and former bandmate) as the bass guitarist, Sergey Mavrin as the second guitarist, and Maxim Udalov on the drums. Their first large show after the reorganization, and the subsequent tour proved that despite all rumours, the band was not dead.

Rise to fame

In August 1987, Aria started working on their new album, Hero of Asphalt (originally named Serving the Forces of Evil), which is considered one of the band's best albums. Hero... was Aria's first album published by the state music publishing monopoly Melodiya. Every show on the subsequent two-year tour sold out. Over a million copies of the album's LP have been sold.  A music video for the song 'Rose Street' was filmed, with the band's fans in mass scenes.

During that time, the band's relationship with their manager had reached a critical point. In October 1988, Udalov left the band because of the conflict, and in November Aleksandr Maniakin was invited to replace him. In 1989, the band then released their next album, Playing With Fire, with Yuriy Fishkin as their manager.

In 1990, Dubinin and Mavrin signed up with the band Lion Heart, and left for Munich, only to return in August after finding an opportunity to cancel their contract. After celebrating their five-year anniversary with several live shows, the band began to work on their fifth album Blood for Blood, which was released in 1991.

1990s

In the early 1990s, the band decreased their activity significantly, greatly reducing the number of live shows they performed. In 1994, they created their own studio: "ARIA Records", and signed a five-year contract with the label Moroz Records. As a result, in the summer of 1994, the band's first five albums were released, including the earlier unreleased Megalomania and Who Are You With?. In September, they toured through Germany for two weeks, with live shows in seven cities, including Berlin's Hard Rock Cafe. 

By the end of the 1994 tour in Germany, the band had a disagreement with the organizers, which also reflected on the relationship within the band. After the tour ended, Kipelov stopped showing up at the studio, where the band was hard at work at their next album. Within a month's time, he was found out to be playing with Master. In December, Alexey Bulgakov (the lead singer for the band Legion) tried out as Kipelov's replacement. In January 1995, Sergey Mavrin left the band, stating that he did not believe that the band would succeed without his friend Kipelov. Sergey Terentyev was invited to replace him as a session musician, and later becomes a permanent member of the band.

Kipelov returned to the band soon after they were threatened with sanctions by MOROZ Records for breaching their contract. He recorded the vocal parts for the new album Night is Shorter Than Day, which was released in September 1995. The band played a series of concerts in the Moscow area, with Sergey Zadora as their new manager, and recorded the live album Made in Russia, which ranked highly in the charts.

In 1997, Kipelov and Mavrin reunited in the duo album Dark Ages. Dubinin and Holstinin also recorded their own, entitled AvARIA (Russian for car incident), where Vitaly participated as a vocalist. In 1998 Aria released Generator of Evil, the album where Terentyev made his début as a songwriter. Next came Chimera and the breakthrough single Lost Paradise, which did well in the Nashe Radio chart and raised Aria to the new level of popularity.

Judgement Day
In 2001, Aria headlined the NASHEstvie festival, where they played with a symphonic orchestra. This gave the band the idea for a 'Classical Aria' tour with an orchestra and a live album of the same name. Unfortunately, this was never released. During the tour, tension among the musicians and the band's management arose. Kipelov refused to record a new album, already written by Dubinin and Holstinin, and declared he wanted to start a solo career. Sergey Terentyev, Alexander Maniakin, and the band's manager Rina Lee supported him, opposing the two band leaders and producer Yuri Sokolov. 'Classical Aria' became the band's farewell tour. After the final gig on 31 August 2002 at Luzhniki, Moscow, which was entitled 'Judgement Day' (this later became the name for the whole incident), Kipelov, Terentyev, and Maniakin left Aria. The next day, they started a new band named Kipelov.

With Arthur Berkut

In November 2002, a new line-up of Aria was announced. Sergey Popov from Master became the second guitarist, Arthur Berkut (ex-Autograph) was invited to be the new vocalist, and drummer Max Udalov returned to the band. On 5 December, Aria released the single 'Coliseum' followed by the album Baptism by Fire. A video for 'Coliseum' was shot. The release was successful, the songs "Coliseum" and "Baptism by Fire" reached No. 1 on the rock charts, though many fans criticized it, arguing that Berkut's voice did not fit Aria's music.

Berkut and Holstinin participated in the Elven Manuscript (2004) metal opera by Epidemia. Arthur played the role of Irdis the elven wizard while Vladimir played the lute and also produced the opera.

In 2005, Aria celebrated its 20th anniversary with a new tour. The band's former members were invited to participate in the anniversary tour. 'Master' and Sergey Mavrin played at it, but Kipelov did not, because of his own tour schedule.

The newest album Armageddon, released by CD Maximum, came out in 2006, where Aria invited two new lyricists and Berkut made his début as composer.

On 3 April 2008, Kipelov and Mavrin made a brief re-union with Aria, during the tour celebrating the 20-year anniversary of the release of Geroy Asfalta.

In November 2010, Berkut and Kipelov sang on stage together with Aria for the 25th anniversary of the band. The concert was called the AriaFest and there were events in Saint Petersburg, Moscow and Ekaterinburg.

In 2011, Aria announced that Berkut was fired. No specific reason was given, but there were rumors that the band was unhappy with Arthur's live performances. He was replaced by Mikhail Zhitnyakov, vocalist of heavy metal band Grand Courage.

With Mikhail Zhitnyakov

In 2011, Aria released Phoenix, followed the next year by Live in the Studio. On 25 November 2014, Aria released their next album, Through All Times. On 13 November 2018, Ariya released the album Proklyat'ye morey (The Curse of the Seas).

Band members
1985–1986
 Valery Kipelov – lead vocals
 Vladimir Holstinin  – guitar
 Alik Granovsky – bass
 Alexander Lvov – drums
 Kirill Pokrovsky  – keyboards

1986–1987
 Valery Kipelov  – lead vocals
 Vladimir Holstinin  – guitar
 Andrey Bolshakov  – guitar
 Alik Granovsky  – bass
 Igor Molchanov  – drums
 Kirill Pokrovsky  – keyboards

1987–1989
 Valery Kipelov – lead vocals
 Vladimir Holstinin – guitar
 Sergey Mavrin – guitar
 Vitaly Dubinin – bass, backing vocals
 Maxim Udalov – drums

1989–1994
 Valery Kipelov – lead vocals
 Vladimir Holstinin – guitar
 Sergey Mavrin – guitar
 Vitaly Dubinin – bass, backing vocals
 Aleksandr Maniakin – drums

1995–2002
 Valery Kipelov – lead vocals
 Vladimir Holstinin – guitar
 Sergey Terentyev – guitar
 Vitaly Dubinin – bass, backing vocals
 Aleksandr Maniakin – drums

2002–2011
 Arthur Berkut  – lead vocals
 Vladimir Holstinin – guitar
 Sergey Popov – guitar
 Vitaly Dubinin – bass, backing vocals
 Maxim Udalov – drums

Current
 Mikhail Zhitnyakov – lead vocals
 Vladimir Holstinin – guitar
 Sergey Popov – guitar
 Vitaly Dubinin – bass, backing vocals
 Maxim Udalov – drums

Timeline

Discography

1985: Мания Величия (Megalomania) 
1986: С Кем Ты? (Who Are You With?)
1987: Герой Асфальта (Hero of Asphalt)
1989: Игра с огнём (Play with Fire)
1991: Кровь за кровь (Blood For Blood)
1995: Ночь короче дня (Night is Shorter Than Day)
1998: Генератор Зла (Generator of Evil)
2001: Химера (Chimera)
2003: Крещение огнём (Baptism by Fire)
2006: Армагеддон (Armageddon)
2011: Феникс (Phoenix)
2014: Через все времена (Through All Times)
2018: Проклятье морей (Curse of the Seas)

Music videos

 Pozadi Amerika (Позади Америка/America behind)
 Volya i razum (Воля и Разум/Will and reason)
 Ulitsa roz (Улица Роз/Street of roses)
 Vse, chto bylo (Всё,Что Было/All that was)
 Otshel'nik (Отшельник/Hermit)
 Gryaz' (Грязь/Dirt)
 Voz'mi moe serdtse (Возьми Моё Сердце/Take my heart)
 Dai zharu (Дай жару/Get it Hot / Give 'em Hell)
 Poteryannyi Rai (Потерянный Рай/The lost paradise)
 Bespechnyi Angel (Беспечный Ангел/cover version of Golden Earring – Going to the Run)
 Oskolok L'da (Осколок Льда/Splinter of ice)
 Shtil (with Udo Dirkschneider) (Штиль/Calm)
 Kolizei (Колизей/Coliseum)
 Kreshenie ognyom (Крещение Огнём/Baptism by fire)
 Tam visoko (Там Высоко/High up there)
 Poslednyi zakat (Последний Закат/The last sunset)
 Vremya Zatmeniy (lyrics video) (Время Затмений/Time of eclipses)
 Tochka Nevozvrata (Точка Невозврата/Point of noreturn)
 Ubit' Drakona (Убить Дракона/To Kill the Dragon)

References

External links

 
Aria on MySpace 
Unofficial forum 
Aria on Nightfall In Metal Earth
Aria on MetalStorm
Aria on Encyclopaedia Metallum
Info, discography and lyrics with English translations
Ariya's official profile on VK

Russian heavy metal musical groups
Russian hard rock musical groups
Soviet rock music groups
Soviet heavy metal musical groups
Musical groups from Moscow
Musical groups established in 1985
1985 establishments in Russia
1985 establishments in the Soviet Union
Musical quintets
Articles which contain graphical timelines